Mobaraki-ye Seh (also Romanized as  Mobārakī-ye Seh and Mobārakī Seh; also known as Mobārakeh-ye Seh, Mobārakī, and Mobārakī-yeh Seh) is a village in Soveyseh Rural District, in the Soveyseh District of Karun County, Khuzestan Province, Iran. At the 2006 census, its population was 147, in 33 families.

References 

Populated places in Karun County